66th Regiment may refer to:

 66th (Berkshire) Regiment of Foot, an infantry unit of the British Army 
 66th (Leeds Rifles) (West Yorkshire Regiment) Heavy Anti-Aircraft Regiment, Royal Artillery, British Army
 66th Punjabis, a unit of the British Indian Army 
 66th Infantry Regiment (United States), a unit of the United States Army 
 66th Armor Regiment, an armoured unit of the US Army
 66th Armoured Regiment (India), an armoured unit of the Indian Army
 66th Infantry Regiment (Imperial Japanese Army), a unit of the Imperial Japanese Army

American Civil War regiments
66th Indiana Infantry Regiment, Union Army
66th Illinois Volunteer Infantry Regiment, Union Army
66th New York Volunteer Infantry, Union Army
66th Ohio Infantry, Union Army

See also
 66th Division (disambiguation)